David S. Wilson (born ca. 1981) is an American politician from Alaska. A Republican, Wilson has represented District D in the Alaska Senate since 2017. He formerly served as a city councilman in Wasilla. Before running for the State Senate, David taught throughout Alaska in rural communities and provided technical assistance to Alaska’s Community Health Clinics and other safety net providers. He has worked in behavioral health field for eleven years; working with children and families, teens and adults. He specialized in working with youth and crisis intervention. More recently David was the director of a domestic violence and sexual assault program.

Wilson was elected to the Senate at the age of 35. He narrowly defeated Representative Lynn Gattis in the Republican primary to succeed longtime Senator Charlie Huggins, who was retiring, in August 2016. He was endorsed in his campaign by the conservative Republican Assembly but did not run with the backing of the Alaska Republican Party. He was previously an unaffiliated voter, registering with the Republican Party less than a year before his primary victory.

Upon being sworn in on January 17, 2017, Wilson became the first African-American elected to the Senate from Alaska's Matanuska-Susitna Valley,  Wilson is the eighth African-American to serve in the Alaska Legislature. Of those eight, he is the third Republican, the second senator, the first Republican senator and the first to represent an area of Alaska outside of Anchorage or Fairbanks.

Due to redistricting in 2020, Wilson now represents Senate District N, which includes the city limits of Wasilla, Meadow Lakes up to Pitman Road, and out to Seldon and Trunk Roads. Wilson was re-elected in 2022 under the new Ranked Choice Voting system in Alaska to serve a two year term due to redistricting.

Legislative Accomplishments 
Senator Wilson has sponsored successful legislation every year he has been in office to date.
This legislation includes:

 SB 46 (2017): "An Act establishing October 25 of each year as African American Soldiers' Contribution to Building the Alaska Highway Day."
 SB 105 (2018): "An Act relating to the licensure of marital and family therapists; providing for a state policy relating to children; relating to medical assistance for marital and family therapy services; relating to disclosure of health care services and price information; relating to health care insurers; and providing for an effective date."
 SB 55 (2019): "An Act relating to judges of the court of appeals; and providing for an effective date."
 SB 25 (2019): "An Act extending the termination date of the Board of Dental Examiners; and providing for an effective date."
 SB 43 (2019): "An Act extending the termination date of the Board of Barbers and Hairdressers; extending the termination date of the Big Game Commercial Services Board; relating to a person's eligibility to hold a registered guide-outfitter license, master guide-outfitter license, class-A assistant guide license, assistant guide license, or transporter license; and providing for an effective date."
 SB 93 (2019): "An Act relating to a workforce enhancement program for health care professionals employed in the state; and providing for an effective date."
 SB 134 (2020): "An Act relating to medical assistance reimbursement for the services of licensed professional counselors; and providing for an effective date."
 SB 24 (2021): "An Act relating to holding corporate meetings by remote communication; allowing voting by remote communication at corporate meetings; making shareholder lists available electronically; relating to for-profit and nonprofit corporations; relating to business and industrial development corporations; relating to Native corporations; relating to the Alaska Banking Code; and providing for an effective date."
 SB 70 (2021): "An Act relating to opioid overdose drugs; and providing for an effective date."
 SB 95 (2022): "An Act relating to the right of first refusal of a volunteer search and rescue group with respect to obsolete or surplus state property."
 SB 173 (2022): "An Act relating to the practice of dentistry; relating to dental radiological equipment; relating to the practice of dental hygiene; relating to advanced practice permits for dental hygienists; relating to dental assistants; prohibiting unfair discrimination under group health insurance against a dental hygienist who holds an advanced practice permit; relating to medical assistance for dental hygiene services; and providing for an effective date."
 SB 174 (2022): "An Act relating to dress codes and natural hairstyles."

Senator Wilson has served on the National Conference of State Legislatures (NCSL) and most recently became the Co-Chair of the NCSL Health and Human Services Committee.

Sponsored Legislation 
Other legislation that Senator Wilson was a prime sponsor of but did not become law include:

 SB 62 (2018): "An Act repealing the certificate of need program for health care facilities; making conforming amendments; and providing for an effective date."
 SB 74 (2017): "An Act relating to care of juveniles and to juvenile justice; relating to employment of juvenile probation officers by the Department of Health and Social Services; relating to terms used in juvenile justice; relating to mandatory reporters of child abuse or neglect; relating to adjudication of minor delinquency and the deoxyribonucleic acid identification registration system; relating to sexual assault in the third degree; relating to sexual assault in the fourth degree; and providing for an effective date."
 SB 90 (2017): "An Act relating to the human services community match program; and relating to the powers of the Department of Health and Social Services."
 SB 153 (2018): "An Act relating to distillery licenses."
 SB 154 (2018): "An Act relating to contributions from permanent fund dividends to the general fund."
 SB 162 (2018): "An Act prohibiting the Department of Health and Social Services from receiving or expending funds for a grant to or contract with an entity that performs abortions or maintains or operates a facility where abortions are performed."
 SB 1 (2019): "An Act repealing the certificate of need program for health care facilities; making conforming amendments; and providing for an effective date."
 SB 92 (2019): "An Act relating to contributions from permanent fund dividends to the general fund."
 SB 96 (2019): "An Act relating to the authority of first class cities and home rule cities to issue, renew, deny, suspend, revoke, and regulate certain licenses involving alcoholic beverages; and relating to the Alcoholic Beverage Control Board."
 SB 97 (2019): "An Act repealing statutes that relate to art works in public buildings and facilities and that require a set percentage of construction costs to be spent on art."
 SB 190 (2020): "An Act relating to the practice of dentistry."
 SB 26 (2022): "An Act repealing the certificate of need program for health care facilities; making conforming amendments; and providing for an effective date."
 SB 175 (2022): "An Act relating to telehealth; relating to the practice of medicine; relating to medical assistance coverage for services provided by telehealth; and providing for an effective date."
 SB 210 (2022): "An Act relating to health care insurers; relating to pharmacy benefits managers; relating to prescription drug cost sharing; and providing for an effective date."

Committee Memberships includes: 

 30th Alaska State Legislature Memberships included: 
 Chair of Senate Health and Social Services
 Member of Senate Public Safety Finance Subcommittee
 Member of Senate Transportation
 31st Alaska State Legislature Memberships Included:
 Vice Chair of Senate Transportation
 Chair of Senate Commerce, Community & Economic Development Finance Subcommittee
 Chair of Senate Environmental Conservation Finance Subcommittee
 Chair of State Revenue Finance Subcommittee
 Chair of Senate Health and Social Services 
 Member of Senate Finance
 Member of Senate University of Alaska Finance Subcommittee
 Member of Senate State Affairs 
 Member of Senate Fish and Game Finance Subcommittee
 32nd Alaska State Legislature Memberships Included:
 Chair Senate Commerce, Community & Economic Development Finance Subcommittee
 Chair Senate Corrections Finance Subcommittee
 Chair Senate Environmental Conservation Finance Subcommittee
 Chair Senate Health & Social Services
 Chair Senate Revenue Finance Subcommittee
 Member Senate University Of Alaska Finance Subcommittee
 Member Senate Finance
 Member Senate Community & Regional Affairs
 Member Senate Ombudsman Selection Committee
 Member Senate Victims Advocate Selection Committee
 Member Senate Fish & Game Finance Subcommittee
 Member Senate Select Committee On Legislative Ethics

 33rd Alaska State Legislature Committee Memberships Include:
 Vice Chair Senate Transportation
 Chair Senate Family & Community Services Finance Subcommittee
 Chair Senate Health Finance Subcommittee
 Chair Senate Health & Social Services
 Alternate Senate Select Committee On Legislative Ethics
 Member Senate University Of Alaska Finance Subcommittee
 Member Senate Finance
 Member Senate Corrections Finance Subcommittee

Campaign Priorities 
Wilson's campaign priorities included the following:

Behavioral Health – It is time to rethink how our public safety, social services, and health care communities respond to individuals with behavioral health issues. With demand for mental health and substance abuse services on the rise, we need to identify creative ways to more efficiently and effectively allocate resources. There is a growing need for coordination among law enforcement and health care professionals to help properly treat individuals suffering from behavioral health issues and provide access to quality care, ensuring funds are used to provide effective treatment.

Economic Development – A strong economy means a healthy future for Alaska. We have abundant natural resources, a trained workforce, and developed transportation routes. I look forward to making sure our region remains competitive in economic development and job creation by continuing to advocate for responsible investments in infrastructure and Alaska’s future.

Education – As we continue to look forward to the future for our state, we need to recognize that education must be a top priority in order to empower and equip our young people for the jobs of the future. When increases in school funding are directed to places other than teacher pay and classroom needs, too many schools remain below average. It is imperative that we continue working to put students first in classroom funding. We must encourage our most successful schools to grow and expand, and use their model to lift under performing schools to greater success.

Limited Government – I was raised to value hard work and personal responsibility. I understand that the government is not the solution to most problems and can sometimes even be the cause. I will support common sense reforms that reduce burdensome regulations and increased accountability and transparency in government.

PFD – Legislators have a great responsibility to protect the PFD of today. They have an even greater responsibility to protect it for the next generation. Our generation is failing, as the future of the PFD is in jeopardy. We have many options to reform and fix the budget. Additional taxes for Alaskans, including PFD cuts, should be off the table until we have a leaner government.

Personal life 
Wilson was born in California and raised in a Christian household. He attended Alaska Pacific University, earning a degree in psychology, where he met his wife, Aleta. Aleta is a lifelong Alaskan who grew up on the Lower Yukon River. Wilson enjoys beekeeping and in 2022, he won first place for his honey at the Alaska State Fair.

Controversies 
On May 2, 2017, Wilson allegedly slapped Nathaniel Herz of the Alaska Dispatch News during an encounter in the Alaska State Capitol in Juneau. The event was recorded by Herz's smartphone as the reporter was questioning Wilson on his reaction to a recent article about a bill proposed by Wilson. Herz filed a police report that day.

On December 12, 2017, The Alaska Office of Special Prosecutions declined to pursue charges against Wasilla Republican Sen. David Wilson for a May incident in which he allegedly slapped Anchorage Daily News reporter Nathaniel Herz. In a letter Tuesday to Juneau police, Chief Assistant Attorney General Andrew Peterson wrote that it is unlikely the state will be able to prove beyond a reasonable doubt that Wilson acted with the specific intent to harass or annoy Herz, the standard for determining harassment in the second degree.

Wilson was cleared of sexual harassment claims by a female legislative aide who claimed he placed a cell phone near her legs. He was, however, found responsible for retaliatory actions against the person who made the complaint by talking about it. Senate President Pete Kelly ordered that Wilson be given a probationary period, during which he would be restricted in travel, demonstrate he knows proper decorum and understands retaliation.

See also
 Black conservatism in the United States
 List of African-American Republicans
 List of first African-American U.S. state legislators

References

1980s births
African-American Christians
African-American state legislators in Alaska
Alaska city council members
Alaska Pacific University alumni
Republican Party Alaska state senators
Living people
People from California
People from Wasilla, Alaska
Year of birth missing (living people)
21st-century American politicians
21st-century African-American politicians
20th-century African-American people